Jacques Huber (13 October 1867 Schleitheim – 18 February 1914 Belém) was a Swiss-Brazilian botanist who did pioneering work on the flora of the Amazon from 1895 until his death. He created and organized the herbarium and arboretum in Belém, Brazil, and was director of the Museu Paraense Emílio Goeldi from 1907 until he died.

Works
Materiaes para a flora amazonica (Vol. 1)
Materiaes para a flora amazonica (Vol.2)
Materiaes para a flora amazonica (Vol.5)
Materiaes para a flora amazonica (Vol.6)
Materiaes para a flora amazonica (Vol.7)

References

External links
Boletim do Museu Paraense Emílio Goeldi. Ciências Humanas
Jacques Huber and the Amazonian Botany

1867 births
1914 deaths
19th-century Swiss botanists
Expatriate academics in Brazil
20th-century Brazilian botanists